Street storming is an occasional and spontaneous social activity in Vietnam. While it is also used to refer to street racing, the term is more often used to call the massive gatherings and celebrations of Vietnamese football supporters and civilians on the streets around the country in response to major victories of Vietnam football teams.

Overview 

Association football is the most popular sport in Vietnam. Google search trends for 2018 in Vietnam show that football was the most searched topic by Vietnamese internet users. Former Prime Minister Nguyễn Xuân Phúc commented that football inspired patriotism and national pride in Vietnam. Taking to the streets to celebrate whenever the national team wins an important match is a habit of Vietnamese supporters, which is one of the culture shocks for foreign visitors. 

Street storming usually occurs when millions of people parade the streets while waving the national flags, honking, singing songs, banging pots and pans, and zipping up and down streets on motorbikes. During street storming, the participants cheer, shake hands and hug each other, even to strangers.

History 

The first recorded occurrences of street storming in Vietnam were in 1995 with the participation of Vietnam national football team in the Southeast Asian Games. After Vietnam's first victorious match against Malaysia on December 4, Vietnamese fans across the country flocked to the streets to cheer and celebrate. As the national team advanced further in the tournament, the gatherings gradually grew bigger and lasted longer, climaxing with Vietnam ending up as the runner-up, when "a sea of people" gathered to welcome the team as they returned on December 18. According to former football player , the team was surprised and excited by the lively scene and love of the fans. Since then, street storming has become a distinctive feature and leisure activity of Vietnamese football fans.

The next instance and the first nationwide street storming occurred in 1998 after the national team defeated Thailand 3–0 in the semi-final match of the 1998 AFF Championship. Five years later, street storming happened again when Vietnamese football supporters in Hanoi, Ho Chi Minh City and other provinces took to the streets to celebrate after the Vietnam U-23 won the semi-final match against Malaysia in the 2003 Southeast Asian Games on December 9, 2003. In the 2008 AFF Suzuki Cup, the streets of Vietnam were once again stormed following the victorious games against Singapore and Thailand on December 21, 24, and 28, in celebration of the nation's first championship. One year later, on December 14, the fans around the country celebrated the 4–1 victory against Singapore in 2009 Southeast Asian Games, although Vietnam later lost to Malaysia in the final match.

After this tournament, Vietnam football team achieved no major successes for nearly 10 years and street storming did not occur again until Vietnam U23, led by the new head coach Park Hang-seo, unexpectedly passed the group stage of the 2018 AFC U-23 Championship before defeating Iraq in January 20 and Qatar in January 23 in the quarter-final and semi-final, respectively. Park Hang-seo's following successes with the 2018 AFF Suzuki Cup's championship, the 2019 AFC Asian Cup's quarter-final round, a victory in the World Cup qualification second round, and the 2019 Southeast Asian Games as well as the 2021 Southeast Asian Games' football gold medal also led to massive celebrations across the country.

Consequences and casualty 

After the national soccer team won its first international title in December 2008, at least four people were killed during the celebration night, with 183 emergency cases of people injured in Ho Chi Minh City and 63 cases of people injured in traffic accidents in Hanoi.

After the street storming on December 10, 2019, 50 traffic accidents were reported with 31 dead and 35 injured.

Criticism 
Journalist Nguyễn Lưu criticized street storming, calling it "misguided fan culture" and a sign of "low education".

References 

Football in Vietnam
Association football culture
Street culture